Bandar-e Shenas (also Romanized as Bandar-e Shenās; also known as Bandar-e Shīās, Shenās, and Shīās) is a village in Moghuyeh Rural District, in the Central District of Bandar Lengeh County, Hormozgan Province, Iran. At the 2006 census, its population was 1,631, in 274 families.

References 

Populated places in Bandar Lengeh County